Radwan or Redwan or Ridwan (in Arabic رضوان) is a given name and a surname. Notable people with the name include:

Patrynom
Ridwan dynasty
Abu Nu'aym Ridwan, minister and military commander in the Emirate of Granada
Ali ibn Ridwan Al-Misri (c. 988 - c. 1061), Arab of Egyptian origin who was a physician, astrologer and astronomer
Fakhr al-Mulk Ridwan (c. 1077 – 1113), Seljuk emir of Aleppo from 1095 until his death

Given name

Radwan
Radwan (bishop of Poznań) (died 1172), bishop of Poznań probably in the years 1164 to 1172
Radwan Al Azhar (born 1979), Syrian footballer
Radwan al-Habib (born 1962), Syrian politician and government minister
Radwan Al Hilu (1909–1975), Palestinian Arab politician 
Radwan Kalaji (born 1992), Syrian footballer
Radwan Karout (born 1950), Syrian wrestler and Olympian
Radwan Ghazi Moumneh, Canadian recording engineer, producer and musician
Radwan Al-Sheikh Hassan, Syrian footballer

Redwan
Redwan Ahmed, Bangladeshi politician and minister
Redwan Bourlès (born 2003), French footballer
Redwan Hussein Rameto (born 1971), Ethiopian politician and diplomat
Redwan Al-Mousa, Saudi Arabian footballer
Redwan Rony or Redoan Rony, Bangladeshi filmmaker
Redwan El-Zaouiki (born 1953), Syrian judoka

Ridwan
Fakhr al-Din ibn al-Sa'ati, known as Ridwan, 13th-century Syrian clockmaker, writer, and government official
Ridwan Pasha (died 1585), 16th-century Ottoman statesman
Ridwan Awaludin (born 1992), Indonesian footballer
Ridwan Kamil (born 1971), Indonesian architect and politician
Ridwan Kodiat (born 1951), Indonesian body builder
Ridwan Laher Nytagodien, South African university professor in political science, an independent political consultant 
Ridwan Suwidi (born 1936), Indonesian politician
Ridwan Tawainella (born 1995), Indonesian footballer

Rizvan

Rizvan, Turkish equivalent of the name

Middle name
Abass Ridwan Duada, Ghanaian politician and member of Parliament
Mohammad Ridwan Hafiedz or Ridho (born 1973), Indonesian guitarist, backing vocalist and songwriter

Surname

Radwan
Adam Radwan (born 1997), English rugby union player
Alexander Radwan (born 1964), German politician
Ashruf Radwan (born 1961), better known as Andy Blade, singer and guitarist of UK punk band Eater
Edmund P. Radwan (1911–1959), American politician
Hisham Radwan (born 1955), Egyptian volleyball player 
Mahmoud Radwan (born 1989), Egyptian handball player
Mohamed Radwan (born 1958), Egyptian football manager
Najim al-Radwan (1972–2018), Saudi Arabian weightlifter
Noha Radwan, Egyptian-born American literary scholar
Rashed Radwan, Spanish film director, producer and writer of Iraqi origin
Sam Radwan, partner and co-founder of ENHANCE International LLC, a management consultancy
Samir Radwan, Egyptian politician
Shady Radwan (born 2001), Egyptian footballer
Stanley Radwan (1908–1998), American strongman and professional wrestler
Tadeusz Radwan (1945–2003), Polish luger
Yasser Radwan (born 1972), Egyptian footballer

Ridwan
Fitra Ridwan (born 1994), Indonesian professional footballer 
Haziq Ridwan (born 1996), Malaysian footballer
Hendra Ridwan (born 1985), Indonesian footballer
Kenny Ridwan (born 1999), American actor
Muhammad Ridwan (born 1980), Indonesian footballer
Muhamad Ridwan (footballer, born June 2000), Indonesian professional footballer

See also
Ridwan (name)

Arabic masculine given names